This is a list of notable botanical illustrators and flower painters born in or citizens of the United States of America.

Botanical illustrators paint or draw plants and sometimes their natural environment as well, forming a lineage where art and science meet. Some prefer to paint isolated specimen flowers while others prefer arrangements. Many botanical artists through the centuries have been active in collecting and cataloguing new species and/or in breeding plants. Some artists listed here worked primarily on botanical art, while others made it part of a wider artistic practice or illustrated books with their artwork.

 Margaret Neilson Armstrong
 Mary Daisy Arnold
 Clarissa Munger Badger
 William Paul Crillon Barton
 Olivia Marie Braida-Chiusano
 Margaret Warriner Buck
 Edith Clements
 Laura Coombs Hills
 Alfred Hoffy
 Louis Charles Christopher Krieger
Dorothy van Dyke Leake
 Elsie E. Lower
 Bessie Niemeyer Marshall
 Joseph Mason
 Amanda Newton
 Deborah Griscom Passmore
 William Henry Prestele 
 Ellen Robbins
 Marion Satterlee
 Ellen Isham Schutt
 Elsie Louise Shaw
 J. Marion Shull
 Susie Barstow Skelding
 Royal Charles Steadman
 Alice Tangerini
 Anna Heyward Taylor
 Emma Homan Thayer
Anne Kingsbury Wollstonecraft

See also
 List of Australian botanical illustrators
 List of Irish botanical illustrators

References 
White, James J., and Erik A. Neumann. "The Collection of Pomological Watercolors at the U.S. National Arboretum". Huntia: A Journal of Botanical History 4:2 (January 1982), pp. 103–104.
Cribb, Phillip. "511. Phragmipedium Kovachii." Curtis's Botanical Magazine 22.1 (2005): 8-11.
Margaret Farr. Brooklyn Botanic Garden website.

Botanical
Lists of botanists
 
Lists of American artists